Raul Santoserpa (born March 1939 in Las Villas, Cuba) is a Cuban artist specializing in painting and engraving.

In 1960 he graduated in Sculpture at the Escuela Provincial de Artes Plásticas “Leopoldo Romañach” Santa Clara, Las Villas, Cuba. Between  1960- 1962 he studied Painting in the Escuela Provincial de Artes Plásticas “Leopoldo Romañach,” Together with his artistic development he was professor of different art schools.  Since 1966 is Member of the Unión de Escritores y Artistas de Cuba (UNEAC). He has been a juror in several fairs and contests.

Individual exhibitions
In 1962 he presented Rostros y Expressiones. Dibujos de Raúl Santos Zerpa at the Círculo de Cultura, Santa Clara, Cuba. In 1971 he presented an exhibition at the (Gallery of the Union of Fine Artists), Warsaw, Poland. he was also in 1988 at the  Galería de Arte, Trinidad, Cuba. In 1995 he did a solo show to celebrate the 306 anniversary of the foundation of the city,  Casa de la Ciudad, Santa Clara, Villa Clara, Cuba.

Collective exhibitions
His works has been presented in collectives shows too. In 1959 where presented with the work of many other artist in Artes Plásticas. Operación Cultura, Universidad de La Habana, Havana, Cuba. In 1970 he was invited to the  Inter-Grafik’70. Altes Museum, Berlin, Germany, In 1975 he was selected to conform the show Panorama del arte cubano de la colonia a nuestros días, Museo de Arte Moderno, Mexico City. Later in 1995 he was at the 1er. Salón de Arte Cubano Contemporáneo, Museo Nacional de Bellas Artes, Havana, Cuba. And in 1998 he did an exhibition with the name Tributo a la danza, Galería Habana, Havana, Cuba.

Awards
He had obtained various prizes and recognitions during his life . Some of them are the National Prize in Drawing. Salón Nacional de Artes Plásticas. Centro de Arte Internacional, Havana, Cuba in 1969. In 1978 he gained the Acquisition Prize of the Lalit Kala Akademy. Fourth Triennale India. He was also awarded with the National Culture Award. Council of State, Republic of Cuba in 1988. And in 1995 he received the  “Güije de Santa Clara” y “306th Anniversary of the Foundation of the City of Santa Clara” Diploma ''Granted for his outstanding artistic contribution, Villa Clara, Cuba.

Collections
These are some of the institutions that collect his pieces: Consejo de Estado, República de Cuba, Cuba, Instituto de Arte Latinoamericano, Santiago de Chile, Chile, Lalit Kala Akademy, New Delhi, India, Museo de Arte Latinoamericano, León, Nicaragua, Museo Nacional de Bellas Artes, Havana, Cuba.

References
 
 

Cuban painters
Modern painters
Cuban contemporary artists
1939 births
Living people